Ryan Cordeiro (born May 6, 1986) is an American former professional soccer player.
Cordeiro attended Monroe-Woodbury High School and played college soccer at the University of Connecticut.

References

External links
Real Maryland Monarchs bio
Player profile at MLS

1986 births
Living people
American soccer players
D.C. United players
Real Maryland F.C. players
UConn Huskies men's soccer players
People from Highland Falls, New York
Major League Soccer players
USL Second Division players
D.C. United draft picks
Soccer players from New York (state)
Sportspeople from the New York metropolitan area
Association football midfielders